Angel(s) in the Snow may refer to:

 Angels in the Snow, a 1969 novel by Derek Lambert
 "Angel in the Snow" (A-ha song), a song on the 1993 album Memorial Beach
 "Angel in the Snow", a song by Elliott Smith from the compilation New Moon

See also

 Snow angel